Mehtab Singh (born 5 June 1998) is an Indian professional footballer who plays as a centre-back for Indian Super League club Mumbai City.

Career

Early career
Mehtab Singh was born in Khemkaran village in Punjab which is only one-and-half kilometres away from the Pakistan border. He travelled around 165 kilometres from Khemkaran to Mahilpur football academy  to learn to play football.
He later represented the East Bengal U18 side in the 2017–18 U18 I-League.

On 13 December 2017, he scored a goal to help his team to a victory over Mohun Bagan in a crucial under-18 I-League match.

East Bengal
He was promoted to the senior squad and played in the 2017–18 Calcutta Premier Division for the club. On 28 November 2017, he made I-League debut in a 2–2 draw against Aizawl.

On 14 November 2018, he suffered a head injury due to an collision with Siddharth Singh during the practice when the duo jumped for an aerial ball as their heads clashed against each other. Mehtab was the worst affected as he was seen with a bloody forehead and lay unconscious for sometime before being rushed to the hospital where he had 18 stitches.

Gokulam Kerala
On 31 January 2019, he was loaned to Gokulam Kerala for the rest of the season. He made a total of 5 appearances for the Kerala side.

Mumbai City
In 2020, Singh moved to Mumbai City and emerged victorious at the 2020–21 Indian Super League. Later in March 2022, he was included in club's 2022 AFC Champions League squad.

Club statistics

Club

International
On 13 February 2019, Singh was called up to the India under-23 side which participated in the 2020 AFC U-23 Championship qualifiers.

He made his debut for the side in a friendly match against Qatar U23 ahead of the competition.

Honours

Club
East Bengal FC
Calcutta Football League: 2017–18

References

1998 births
Living people
Indian footballers
Association football defenders
Gokulam Kerala FC players
East Bengal Club players
Indian Super League players
Mumbai City FC players
Footballers from Punjab, India